Morris Cohen (November 27, 1911 – May 27, 2005), born in Chelsea, Massachusetts, United States, was a Jewish American metallurgist, who spent his entire career affiliated with MIT. He graduated from his undergraduate degree in 1933, receiving his doctorate three years later, and was appointed assistant professor of metallurgy in 1937. He was appointed Professor of Physical Metallurgy in 1946, and an Institute Professor in 1975. He took emeritus status in 1982.

He worked on the Manhattan Project during the Second World War. He and his colleagues developed fuel rods for Enrico Fermi's nuclear reactor at the University of Chicago.

He has been awarded the gold medal by the ASM International (formerly American Society for Metals) (1968) and the Japan Institute of Metals (1970), the National Medal of Science in 1976, and the Kyoto Prize in 1987.

References

External links 
 MIT newsoffice obituary
 

1911 births
Members of the United States National Academy of Sciences
American metallurgists
Jewish American scientists
Kyoto laureates in Advanced Technology
MIT School of Engineering faculty
National Medal of Science laureates
People from Chelsea, Massachusetts
Manhattan Project people
2005 deaths
Fellows of the Minerals, Metals & Materials Society
20th-century American Jews
21st-century American Jews